Danny La Rue,  (born Daniel Patrick Carroll, 26 July 1927 – 31 May 2009) was an Irish singer and entertainer, best known for his on-stage drag persona. He performed in drag and also as himself in theatrical productions, television shows and film.

Early life
Born Daniel Patrick Carroll in Cork City, Ireland, in 1927, La Rue was the youngest of five siblings. The family moved to England when he was six and he was brought up at Earnshaw Street in Covent Garden, central London. When the family home was destroyed during the Blitz, his mother, a seamstress, moved her children to Kennford, a Devon village where young Daniel developed an interest in dramatics. "There weren't enough girls so I got the pick of the roles ... My Juliet was very convincing", La Rue recalled.

He served in the Royal Navy as a young man following in his father's footsteps, and for a time worked delivering groceries. He became known as a female impersonator, or "comic in a frock" as he preferred to be called, in the United Kingdom and was featured in theatre productions, and in film, television and records.

Career
Among his celebrity impersonations were Elizabeth Taylor, Zsa Zsa Gabor, Judy Garland, Margot Fonteyn, Marlene Dietrich and Margaret Thatcher. At one point he had his own nightclub in Hanover Square, and also performed on London's West End. In the 1960s, he was among Britain's highest-paid entertainers. In the 1970s, he owned the Swan, a noted inn at Streatley on the River Thames.

In 1982 he played Dolly Levi in the musical Hello, Dolly!. He also has the distinction of being the only man to take over a woman's role in the West End theatre when he replaced Avis Bunnage in Oh, What a Lovely War! and he was until his death still a regular performer in traditional Christmas pantomime shows in Britain.

In 1968 his version of "On Mother Kelly's Doorstep" reached number 33 in the UK singles chart; La Rue later adopted the song as his theme tune.

He had a starring role in the film Our Miss Fred in 1972, and also appeared in Every Day's a Holiday, The Frankie Howerd Show, Twiggs, Decidedly Dusty, Entertainment Express, Blackpool Bonanza and the BBC's Play of the Month in a production of Charley's Aunt (1969). He made a guest appearance as himself in the Mr. Bean episode "Mr. Bean in Room 426" in 1993.

La Rue's final major public appearance was in Hello Danny, a biographical show performed at the "Benidorm Palace", which opened on 11 November 2007. The part of the young La Rue was played by Jerry Lane, who also co-created and directed. La Rue appeared at the start of the show and then in an interview on stage in part of the second half. He also performed a number of songs.

Personal life
La Rue would often perform parts of his show in men's clothes, and was often seen out of costume on television. In later life, he was more candid about his private life, including his homosexuality. La Rue lived with his manager and life partner of 37 years, Jack Hanson, until Hanson's death in 1984. They had met following World War II in 1947.

In 1970, La Rue bought The Swan Inn at Streatley in Berkshire. He was later forced by circumstances to sell it.

In the 1970s, La Rue spent more than £1 million on the purchase and restoration of a country house hotel, Walton Hall, in Warwickshire, and signed it over in 1983, as he could not manage it and his career, to a pair of Canadian con men. La Rue had given control of the hotel to the two Canadians with a promise of further investment with the retention of La Rue's name on the hotel itself. This eventually led to a police investigation where La Rue was cleared of any suspicion but discovered he had lost more than £1 million. The con men had bankrupted La Rue but he insisted in continuing to work to pay off the debts incurred rather than retire.

Illness and death
La Rue suffered a mild stroke in January 2006 while in Spain on holiday: as a result, his final pantomime and all subsequent performances were cancelled. He had been suffering from prostate cancer for many years. He had several further strokes and developed throat cancer.

He died shortly before midnight on 31 May 2009 at the age of 81. His friend and costume designer, Annie Galbraith, was with him (he was living at her home in Tunbridge Wells) when he died. La Rue was laid to rest with his partner, Jack Hanson, in St Mary's Catholic Cemetery, Kensal Green, west London.

Accolades
He was appointed OBE in the 2002 Queen's Birthday Honours List. La Rue later stated in an interview that this was "the proudest day of his life". Other accolades included Royal Variety Performance appearances in 1969, 1972 and 1978, Variety Club of Great Britain Showbiz Personality of the Year (1969), Theatre Personality of the Year (1970), Entertainer of the Decade (1979) and the Brinsworth Award from the EABF for his outstanding contribution to the entertainment profession and the community. In 1987, he was King Rat of the showbusiness charity the Grand Order of Water Rats.

La Rue was the subject of a specially extended edition of This Is Your Life in 1984 when he was surprised by Eamonn Andrews at the curtain call of Hello, Dolly! at London's Prince of Wales Theatre.

He has also been described as "the grande dame of drag".

Selected filmography
Our Miss Fred (1972)
Come Spy with Me (TV film) (1977)
The Good Old Days (Christmas Eve, 1983)
Mr. Bean episode, "Mr. Bean in Room 426" (1993)

Bibliography
La Rue, Danny (1987) From Drags to Riches: my autobiography, Harmondsworth: Viking, 
Underwood, Peter (1974) Life's a drag : Danny la Rue & the drag scene, London: Frewin, 
Baker, Roger (1968)  Drag: A History of female impersonation on the stage, Triton:

See also
Danny the Street—comic book character named after Danny La Rue ("la rue" in French translates into English as "the street")

References

External links

Obit in the ''Daily Telegraph

1927 births
2009 deaths
British hoteliers
British autobiographers
English drag queens
English LGBT singers
English LGBT businesspeople
English gay musicians
Burials at St Mary's Catholic Cemetery, Kensal Green
Deaths from cancer in England
Deaths from prostate cancer
Gay entertainers
Gay singers
Gay businessmen
Irish emigrants to the United Kingdom
Irish gay musicians
Irish LGBT singers
Irish LGBT businesspeople
Irish drag queens
Officers of the Order of the British Empire
Pantomime dames
People from Soho
People from Teignbridge (district)
Royal Navy sailors
20th-century English businesspeople
20th-century English male singers
English Roman Catholics
20th-century Irish LGBT people
21st-century Irish LGBT people
20th-century English LGBT people
21st-century English LGBT people
Deaths from throat cancer
People from Cork (city)